Antoine Étienne Renaud Augustin Serres (12 September 1786, Clairac – 22 January 1868, Paris) was a French physician and embryologist. He was among the first to formulate the recapitulation theory.

Background 

Étienne Serres was the son of Jean Jacques Serres, "maître chirurgien" and Marie Roussel. In 1810 Serres received his medical doctorate in Paris, and afterwards worked at the Hôtel-Dieu de Paris and the Hôpital de la Pitié. In 1841 he was chosen president of the French Academy of Sciences. From 1850 to 1868 he was chair of comparative anatomy at the Muséum national d'histoire naturelle. Serres' scientific work was influenced by the theories of Lorenz Oken (1779–1851), Georges Cuvier (1769–1832), and especially Étienne Geoffroy Saint-Hilaire (1772–1844).

With German anatomist, Johann Friedrich Meckel (1781–1833), the supposed "Meckel-Serres Law" is obtained. This was a theory that attempted to provide a link between comparative embryology and a "pattern of unification" in the organic world. It was based on a belief that within the entire animal kingdom there was a single unified body-type, and that during development, the organs of higher animals matched the forms of comparable organs in lower animals. This theory applied to both vertebrates and invertebrates, and also stated that higher animals go through embryological stages analogous to the adult stages of lower life-forms in the course of their development, a version of the recapitulation theory later ossified in the statement "Ontogeny recapitulates phylogeny" of Ernst Haeckel.

In the field of teratology, Serres explained the presence of malformations as cases of arrested development or overdevelopment. He had disagreements with Charles Darwin regarding the latter's evolutionary theories. Serres believed that humans were creatures set apart and a supreme goal of all creation.

Associated eponyms 
 Serres' angle: Also known as the metafacial angle, an angle between the base of the skull and the pterygoid process.
 Serres' glands: Epithelial cell rests found in the subepithelial connective tissue in the palate of the newborn.

Selected writings 
 Essai sur l'anatomie et la physiologie des dents, ou Nouvelle théorie de la dentition, 1817 - Essay on the anatomy and physiology of the teeth, or a new theory about dentition.
 Anatomie comparée du cerveau, dans les quatre classes des animaux vertébrés, appliquée à la physiologie et à la pathologie du système nerveux, 1824-1827 - Comparative anatomy of the brain, in the four classes of vertebrates, as it applies to the physiology and pathology of the nervous system.
 Principes d'embryogénie, de zoogénie et de tératogénie, 1859 - Principles of embryology, zoology and teratology.

See also 
 List of Chairs of the Muséum national d'histoire naturelle

References
  Form and Function a Contribution to the History of Animal Morphology By E. S. Russell. Russell was an “unabashed vitalist” who both rejected and misrepresented the Darwinian formulation of recapitulation defended by Ernst Haeckel (S. Gliboff. 2008. H. G. Bronn, Ernst Haeckel, and the Origins of German Darwinism. MIT Press -- see page 22)
 Rare Volumes, Serres' Comparative Anatomy and Principles of Embryology
 This article incorporates text from an equivalent article at the Spanish Wikipedia.

External links

Officers of the French Academy of Sciences
French embryologists
19th-century French physicians
Teratologists
1786 births
1868 deaths
People from Lot-et-Garonne